This is a list of bridges and tunnels on the National Register of Historic Places in the U.S. state of Arizona.

See also
List of bridges in Arizona

References

 
Arizona
Bridges
Bridges